David Goffin was the defending champion, but chose not to compete.

Radek Štěpánek won the title, defeating Leonardo Mayer in the final, 6–3, 6–4.

Seeds

Draw

Finals

Top half

Bottom half

References
 Main Draw
 Qualifying Draw

2013 Singles
2013 ATP Challenger Tour